Tenderly (internationally released as The Girl Who Couldn't Say No, also known as Il suo modo di fare) is a 1968 Italian comedy film directed by Franco Brusati. It was referred as "a successful attempt to refresh the American sophisticated comedy with themes and sensibilities of today" and its style was compared to Frank Capra's.

Plot
After fifteen years apart, a young, motivated surgeon named Franco (Segal) runs into his childhood friend Yolanda (Lisi) in Rome. They fall in love and travel to Florence together, but Yolanda's unpredictable, often unusual personality makes the future of their relationship highly uncertain.

Cast
 Virna Lisi : Yolanda 
 George Segal : Franco
 Lila Kedrova : Yolanda's Mother 
 Akim Tamiroff :  Uncle Egidio 
 Paola Pitagora : Widow 
 Mario Brega : Cripple 
 Riccardo Billi : Salesman
 Anne Cumming : Franco's mother

Production
It was known during shooting as Runaround.

References

External links

1968 comedy films
1968 films
Films directed by Franco Brusati
Italian comedy films
1960s Italian films